The Dawei River or Tavoy River is a river of the Tanintharyi Region, Burma.

Geography
It has its source in the Tenasserim Hills and flows from north to south, the northern branch of the Tenasserim River running parallel to it. It ends in the Andaman Sea coast. In the last stretch of its course it forms a navigable estuary before it meets the sea.
Off the shore there are a number of small islands on the western side of the estuarine area.

Dawei (Tavoy) town is located at the head of the estuary by the river at a distance about 40 km from its mouth.

See also
List of rivers in Burma

References

External links

Tavoy deep-sea port project brings fears of relocation

Rivers of Myanmar
Tanintharyi Region